Xeracris is a genus of slant-faced grasshoppers in the family Acrididae. There are at least two described species in Xeracris.

Species
These two species belong to the genus Xeracris:
 Xeracris minimus (Scudder, 1900) (least desert grasshopper)
 Xeracris snowi (Caudell, 1915) (Snow's desert grasshopper)

References

Further reading

 
 
 

Acrididae
Articles created by Qbugbot